Lake Township is one of ten townships in Newton County, Indiana. As of the 2010 census, its population was 2,384 and it contained 1,006 housing units.

Geography

Unincorporated towns
 Conrad at 
 Lake Village at 
 Sumava Resorts at 
(This list is based on USGS data and may include former settlements.)

References

External links
 Indiana Township Association
 United Township Association of Indiana

Townships in Newton County, Indiana
Townships in Indiana